Stephen of Perm (Russian: Стефан Пермский, Stefan Permskiy; , Perymsa Stepan; Old Permic: 𐍟𐍔𐍠 h t 𐍡𐍢𐍔𐍟𐍐𐍝 l; 1340–1396) was a fourteenth-century painter and missionary credited with the conversion of the Komi to Christianity and the establishment of the Bishopric of Perm'. Stephen also created the Old Permic script, which makes him the founding-father of Permian written tradition. "The Enlightener of Perm" or the "Apostle of the Permians", as he is sometimes called, is commemorated by the Catholic and Orthodox Churches on April 26.

Life

Stephen was probably from the town of Ustiug. According to a church tradition, his mother was a Komi woman and his father was a Russian man. Stephen took his monastic vows in Rostov, where he learned Greek and learned his trade as a copyist. In 1376, he voyaged to lands along the Vychegda and Vym rivers, and it was then that he engaged in the conversion of the Zyriane (Komi peoples). Rather than imposing the Latin or Church Slavonic on the indigenous pagan populace, as all the contemporary missionaries did, Stephen learnt their language and traditions and worked out a distinct writing system for their use, creating the second oldest writing system for a Uralic language. Although his destruction of pagan idols (e.g., holy birches) earned him the wrath of some Permians, Pimen, the Metropolitan of All Rus', created him as the first bishop of Perm'.

The effect of the new bishopric and the conversion of the Vychegda Perm threatened the control that Novgorod had been enjoying over the region's tribute. In 1385, the Archbishop of Novgorod Aleksei (r. 1359–1388) sent a Novgorodian army to oust the new establishment, but the new bishopric, with the help of the city of Ustiug, was able to defeat it. In 1386, Stephan visited Novgorod, and the city and its archbishop formally acknowledged the new situation. Subsequently, the region's tribute became the luxury of Moscow. These events had immense repercussions for the future of northern Russia, and formed but one part of a larger trend which saw more and more of the Finnic North and its precious pelts passing from the control of Novgorod to Moscow.

The historian Serge A. Zenkovsky wrote that St. Stephen of Perm, along with Epiphanius the Wise, St. Sergius of Radonezh, and the great painter Andrei Rublev signified "the Russian spiritual and cultural revival of the late fourteenth and early fifteenth century." Indeed, Stephen's life encapsulates both the political and religious expansion of "Muscovite" Russia. Stephen's life was in fact commemorated in the writings of the aforementioned Epiphanius, who famously wrote the Panegyric to Saint Stephen of Perm, a text that praises Stephen for his evangelical activities, and styles him the "creator of Permian letters".

Notes

References
Ferguson, Charles. 1971. St. Stefan of Perm and applied linguistics.  (Originally published in 1967, in To Honor Roman Jakobson, ed. by Morris Halle, pp. 643–653.  The Hague: Mouton.  Also reprinted in 1968 Language Problems of Developing Nations, ed. by Joshua Fishman, Charles Ferguson, and J. Das Gupta, pp. 27–35. New York Wiley and Sons.) Language Structure and Language Use: Essays by Charles Ferguson, ed. by Answar S. Dil, pp. 197–218.  Stanford: Stanford University Press.
Martin, Janet, Medieval Russia, 980-1584, (Cambridge, 1995), pp. 225–6
Zenkovsky, Serge A. (ed.), Medieval Russia's Epics, Chronicles, and Tales, Revised Edition, (New York, 1974), pp. 259–62

External links
 Medieval "Life" of Saint Stephen 
 A chapter from "The Saints of Ancient Rus", by Georgy Fedotov 
 Life of Saint Stephen, with illustrations 

1340 births
1396 deaths
People from Veliky Ustyug
Russian explorers
Russian saints of the Eastern Orthodox Church
Eastern Catholic saints
Creators of writing systems
Eastern Orthodox missionaries
14th-century Christian saints
Russian inventors
Missionary linguists